a.k.a. Torasan Meets his School-Mates and Tora-san's Heart of Gold is a 1976 Japanese comedy film directed by Yoji Yamada. It stars Kiyoshi Atsumi as Torajirō Kuruma (Tora-san), and Machiko Kyō as his love interest or "Madonna". Tora's Pure Love is the eighteenth entry in the popular, long-running Otoko wa Tsurai yo series, and was Machiko Kyō's penultimate film appearance.

Plot
When Tora-san's infatuation with his nephew's school teacher causes family turmoil, he leaves on his travels again. When he returns, he falls in love with the teacher's mother, who has a terminal illness.

Cast
 Kiyoshi Atsumi as Torajirō
 Chieko Baisho as Sakura
 Machiko Kyō as Aya Yagyū
 Fumi Dan as Masako Yagyū
 Masami Shimojō as Kuruma Tatsuzō
 Chieko Misaki as Tsune Kuruma (Torajiro's aunt)
 Gin Maeda as Hiroshi Suwa
 Hayato Nakamura as Mitsuo Suwa
 Hisao Dazai as Boss (Umetarō Katsura)
 Gajirō Satō as Genkō
 Chishū Ryū as Gozen-sama
 Yoshio Yoshida as Chairman
 Mari Okamoto as Sayuri Ōzora

Critical appraisal
Tora's Pure Love was the sixth top-grossing Japanese film of 1976. However, Stuart Galbraith IV writes that the film is disappointing in comparison with the previous Tora-san's Sunrise and Sunset (also 1976), more sentimental and less well-plotted than the earlier film. Galbraith judges Tora's Pure Love nevertheless to be funny, and enjoyable for the scenes between series star Kiyoshi Atsumi and actress Machiko Kyō in one of her last appearances. The German-language site molodezhnaja gives Tora's Pure Love three and a half out of five stars.

Availability
Tora's Pure Love was released theatrically on December 25, 1976. In Japan, the film was released on videotape in 1996, and in DVD format in 1999 and 2008.

References

Bibliography

English

German

Japanese

External links
 Tora's Pure Love at www.tora-san.jp (official site)

1976 films
Films directed by Yoji Yamada
1976 comedy films
1970s Japanese-language films
Otoko wa Tsurai yo films
Japanese sequel films
Shochiku films
Films with screenplays by Yôji Yamada
1970s Japanese films